Tinca is a commune in the south-central part of Bihor County, Crișana, Romania. It is composed of five villages: Belfir, Gurbediu, Girișu Negru, Râpa and Tinca.

Historic attestation
It was first mentioned as a village in a Papal document in 1338.

Tourism
It is known locally for its magnesium and calcium-rich mineral water springs.

Geography and climate
The average elevation is 130 meters.

Rainfall is about 750 mm / 29 inches a year.

Ethnic structure
Tinca village had a population of 7,793 in 2011, of which:
60% are Romanian
15% are Hungarian
15% are Roma.
10% are other.

References

  Tinca town hall website

Communes in Bihor County
Localities in Crișana